The affaire des poudres (French: "gunpowder scandal" or "gunpowder incident") may refer to:

 The Siege of Lille (1708)
 The Iéna Disaster